Loïc Merel (born 13 August 1965) is a French mathematician. His research interests include modular forms and number theory.

Career
Born in Carhaix-Plouguer, Brittany, Merel became a student at the École Normale Supérieure. He finished his doctorate at Pierre and Marie Curie University under supervision of Joseph Oesterlé in 1993. His thesis on modular symbols took inspiration from the work of Yuri Manin and Barry Mazur from the 1970s. In 1996, Merel proved the torsion conjecture for elliptic curves over any number field (which was only known for number fields of degree up to 8 at the time). In recognition of his achievement, in 1998 he was an Invited Speaker of the International Congress of Mathematicians in Berlin.

Awards

References

External links
Website at Paris Diderot University

1965 births
Living people
École Normale Supérieure alumni
People from Finistère
21st-century French mathematicians
University of Paris alumni
Scientists from Brittany